Hot Country Songs is a chart that ranks the top-performing country music songs in the United States, published by Billboard magazine.  In 1997, 23 different songs topped the chart, then published under the title Hot Country Singles & Tracks, in 52 issues of the magazine.  Chart rankings were based on weekly airplay data from country music radio stations compiled by Nielsen Broadcast Data Systems.

At the start of the year, the number one song was "One Way Ticket (Because I Can)" by LeAnn Rimes, which had reached the top of the chart in the issue of Billboard dated December 28, 1996.  It remained at the top for one further week in 1997 before Kevin Sharp began a four-week run at the top with his debut single, a cover version of R&B singer Tony Rich's song "Nobody Knows".  This would prove to be the only number-one hit for Sharp, who died in 2014 at age 43.  Three other vocalists achieved their first number-one country songs in 1997.  Rick Trevino spent one week in the top spot in March with "Running Out of Reasons to Run", which would also prove to be his only number one.  Trace Adkins achieved the feat with "(This Ain't) No Thinkin' Thing" in April, and Michael Peterson scored his first and only chart-topper in December with "From Here to Eternity".

George Strait spent the highest number of total weeks at number one with nine, comprising five with "One Night at a Time" and four with "Carrying Your Love with Me".  The only other acts to have more than one chart-topper during the year were Deana Carter and Tim McGraw.  "It's Your Love", McGraw's duet with his wife Faith Hill, spent six weeks in the top spot, the longest unbroken run of the year.  Hill was one of five female vocalists to spend time in the top spot in 1997; during the late 1990s, female performers achieved a level of success on the country charts greater than they had in the first half of the decade or would in the subsequent decade.  The final number one of the year was "Longneck Bottle" by Garth Brooks.

Chart history

See also
1997 in music
List of artists who reached number one on the U.S. country chart

References

1997
1997 record charts
Country